The Afourer Pumped Storage Station is a pumped storage hydroelectric scheme located in the hills above Afourer of Azilal Province, Morocco. Construction on the project began in 2001 and was complete in 2004. It was funded by the Arab Fund for Economic & Social Development at a cost of US$220 million.

Design and operation
Step 1's power and pumping station contains 2 x 172.5 MW reversible Francis turbines. The power station at the lower reservoir, Step 2, contains 2 x  reversible Francis turbines From the lower reservoir, water can be pumped back into the upper reservoir or released into a canal near Afourer for use in irrigation.

See also

 List of power stations in Morocco

References

Energy infrastructure completed in 2004
Hydroelectric power stations in Morocco
Pumped-storage hydroelectric power stations
Buildings and structures in Béni Mellal-Khénifra
21st-century architecture in Morocco